Patricia Forsythe  (born 1 March 1952) is an Australian politician and diplomat who was the Australian High Commissioner to New Zealand from March 2019 to March 2022. She was previously the Executive Director of the Sydney Business Chamber since September 2006. Prior to her appointment to the Chamber, she was a member of the Legislative Council of New South Wales representing the Liberal Party between 1991 and 2006.

Biography
Born in Newcastle, New South Wales, she received a Bachelor of Arts (Diploma of Education) from the University of Newcastle, Australia and became a high school teacher from 1974 to 1978 and 1983 to 1986. She had joined the Liberal Party in 1968, and served on the State Executive 1982-1991 and 1993–1995. After a period as a public affairs manager from 1987 to 1988, she was Executive Officer to the Minister for Local Government and Planning from 1988 to 1991.

Political career

In 1991, Forsythe was elected to the New South Wales Legislative Council as a Liberal member. During her period in the Legislative Council, Forsythe spoke against moves by the Federal party and student Liberal organisations who were promoting voluntary student unionism  In 2005, Forsythe expressed concern over the "extreme religious right" in the Liberal Party after the resignation and suicide attempt of then Liberal leader John Brogden. Forsythe named David Clarke as leader of the religious right.

Forsythe was challenged for preselection by Matthew Mason-Cox for the 2007 state election. However, she resigned on 22 September 2006 and took up appointment as Executive Director of the NSW Business Chamber. She was replaced by Mason-Cox in the Legislative Council.

Life after politics
Forsythe is currently a member of the Council of Macquarie University, and serves on the boards of the Hunter Development Corporation, the Hunter Medical Research Institute, Business Events Sydney, the Anglican Board of Mission, and Cricket NSW. She has previously been a member of the National Trust, the Institute of Political Science, the Sydney Institute, Amnesty International, and Friends of La Perouse Museum.

On 1 March 2019 it was announced that Forsythe had been appointed the post of High Commissioner to New Zealand, despite having no previous diplomatic experience and the role being typically held by a career Department of Foreign Affairs officer. Forsythe served concurrently as non-resident High Commissioner to the Cook Islands and Niue until 2020, and completed her term as High Commissioner to New Zealand in March 2022.

Forsythe was appointed a Member of the Order of Australia in 2019 for significant service to business, and to the people and Parliament of New South Wales.

References

Further reading

 

1952 births
Living people
Liberal Party of Australia members of the Parliament of New South Wales
Members of the New South Wales Legislative Council
21st-century Australian politicians
Women members of the New South Wales Legislative Council
Members of the Order of Australia
High Commissioners of Australia to New Zealand
21st-century Australian women politicians
High Commissioners of Australia to the Cook Islands
High Commissioners of Australia to Niue